The Primor'ye class are a group of spy ships built for the Soviet Navy. Two ships are operated by the Russian Navy. The Soviet designation was Project 394B.

Design and role

The ships were designed to gather SIGINT and COMINT electronic intelligence via an extensive array of sensors. The data could be transmitted to shore via satellite link antennas. The ships were converted from the hulls of large trawlers.

Ships
Two ships are in service with the Black Sea Fleet:

SSV-590 Krym 
SSV-591 Kavkaz 

Four further ships were retired in the mid-to-late 1990s.

See also
List of ships of the Soviet Navy
List of ships of Russia by project number

References
- page from Hazegray
 Primor'ye class surveillance ships - Complete Ship List

Signals intelligence
Auxiliary ships of the Soviet Navy
Auxiliary surveillance ship classes